Black Superman may refer to:

People
 Ahmed Johnson (born 1963), American wrestler and football player
 Billy Ray Bates (born 1956), American professional basketball player

Entertainment
 Abar, the First Black Superman, a 1977 blaxploitation film
 "Black Superman", a song by Above the Law from the 1994 album Uncle Sam's Curse
 "Black Superman (Muhammad Ali)", a song by Johnny Wakelin
 Calvin Ellis, an alternative, multi-racial version of Superman